"Mid-Life Crustacean" is the second half of the 15th episode of the third season and the 55th overall episode of the American animated television series SpongeBob SquarePants. The episode premiered on Nickelodeon on January 24, 2003. It is no longer rerunning on Nickelodeon as of 2018, and is also not available to watch on Paramount+, or to be purchased digitally on Amazon. It is still available on home media releases, and pieces of the episode can be still seen ongoing on the Nickelodeon and SpongeBob SquarePants official YouTube channels.

The episode's title is a play on the phrase "midlife crisis."

Plot
Mr. Krabs struggles to get out of bed; after getting up, he asks Pearl if she thinks he's old, which Pearl says she does. When he arrives to the Krusty Krab, he overhears a customer complaining that their Krabby Patty tastes weird, which their mother comments that it is "all old and dried out," comparing it to Mr. Krabs, upsetting him further. After SpongeBob and Patrick announce their "big night out," Mr. Krabs asks to join, in an attempt to feel young again.

During the evening, SpongeBob and Patrick arrive at Mr. Krabs' house, and the three characters take off to a laundromat, where SpongeBob and Patrick watch their faces spin in the mirror's reflection of a washing machine; Mr. Krabs finds this activity boring, and would rather see more of the nightlife. They then partake in several more bizarre activities, none of which satisfies Mr. Krabs. At an arcade, SpongeBob, Patrick and several children ask Mr. Krabs if he's "feeling it" multiple times, which angers him, berating the duo. As he's about to cancel his night out, Patrick then changes his mind when he reveals that they are going out on a "panty raid," grabbing the interest of Mr. Krabs.

When SpongeBob, Patrick and Mr. Krabs arrive to grab a woman's underwear from her dresser drawer, they are caught, and it turns out that the woman happens to be Krabs' mother; SpongeBob and Patrick never told him it was her house they were raiding. Because of the boys' lie by omission, she grounds Mr. Krabs; SpongeBob follows him and apologizes, to which Mr. Krabs forgives him, saying in reference to his old room's race car bed and toys: “I certainly feel younger”. As SpongeBob and Patrick leave, Mr. Krabs is ordered by his mother to shut off his bedroom lights, to which he dejectedly abides.

Reception and controversy
In its initial airing, the episode received generally positive reviews from critics and fans. "Mid-Life Crustacean" was ranked #86 during the "SpongeBob's Top 100" event in the UK and Ireland from June 4-8, 2012, and it is generally still considered a fan-favourite episode and one of the best episodes in the series.

Nickelodeon claims to have withdrawn the episode from further reruns in 2018 in the U.S. While never officially confirmed, it was heavily suggested that the prominence of the "panty raid" scene and the wake of the MeToo and Time's Up movement has led to this removal. However, Nickelodeon has claimed the episode was pulled because it's inappropriate for young children, even though there are other episodes in the franchise with adult humor. 

A representative from Nickelodeon said, "'Mid-Life Crustacean' has been out of rotation since 2018, following a standards review in which we determined some story elements were not kid-appropriate.- IGN " 

Allegra Frank at Slate commented in 2021 "...as a nostalgia buff who looks to Paramount+ solely to sate that need, seeing a small piece of SpongeBob history be stripped away by its parent company is jarring. There are tons of other 11-minute SpongeBob adventures to enjoy, but there’s nothing like watching an episode and having that warm feeling of remembering it; I’m sad I won’t get to have that with that now-infamous 'panty raid' episode anymore." In a 2021 article discussing the controversy around the episode by Comic Book Resources, writer Reuben Baron considered it a great episode, reasoning "There's tons of great character-based humor driven by Mr. Krabs' mid-life crisis, Pearl's embarrassment about her dad and SpongeBob and Patrick's gleeful strangeness."

References

External links
 

2003 American television episodes
Animation controversies in television
Midlife crisis in television
SpongeBob SquarePants episodes
Television controversies in the United States
Obscenity controversies in television
Obscenity controversies in animation
Television episodes pulled from general rotation